Chromodoris albolimbata is a species of colourful sea slug, a dorid nudibranch, a marine gastropod mollusc in the family Chromodorididae.

Distribution
This species was described from a single specimen collected at 37 m depth off Sebastian Bluff (Saint Sebastian Point), near Stilbaai, South Africa.

Description
The description of the external appearance of this species is brief and it may be impossible to recognise it. The description reads "The colour clear reddish-white, the brim of the back chalk-white". The specimen was 15 mm in length.

References

Chromodorididae
Gastropods described in 1907